Los Duros: The Mixtape is a collaborative mixtape by artists signed to the label EME Music, mainly the stars: Baby Rasta & Gringo, Kendo Kaponi & Bobby "El Lobo Negro" with featured artists such as: Arcángel, Ňengo Flow, Voltio, J Alvarez. This mixtape released March 24, 2012 and was nominated for Urban Album of the Year at the 2013 Lo Nuestro Awards.

Track listing

References 

2012 mixtape albums
Reggaeton albums